VfB Aßlar is a German football club from the city of Aßlar, Hesse. The club was established on 25 April 1924 and in 1937 was joined by Turnverein 1908 Aßlar. In 1954 TV went its own way again as a separate side.

History
In 1971 VfB advanced to the Amateurliga Hessen (III) after finishing second in the Landesliga Hessen-Mitte (IV). They played a single season in the Amateurliga and were relegated after a 16th-place finish. Over the next half dozen seasons Aßlar earned mid-table results in Landesliga play before being demoted in 1978. The team had two more turns in the Landesliga in 1980–81 and 1984–88 before descending into lower-tier competition.

In the 2014–15 season, VfB played in the Kreisoberliga Gießen/Marburg West (VIII).

References

External links
 
 Official team site of youth dept.
 Das deutsche Fußball-Archiv historical German domestic league tables 

Football clubs in Germany
Football clubs in Hesse
Association football clubs established in 1924
1924 establishments in Germany